Arknights is a free-to-play tactical RPG/tower defense mobile game developed by Chinese developer Hypergryph. It was released in China on 1 May 2019, in other countries on 16 January 2020 and in Taiwan on 29 June 2020. Arknights is available on Android and iOS platforms and features gacha game mechanics.

A spin-off game, Arknights: Endfield, was announced for PC and mobile devices in March 2022. An anime television series adaptation by Yostar Pictures aired from October to December 2022. A second season has been announced.

Gameplay 

The core gameplay is that of a tower defense game, with a number of characters ("operators") as towers. Melee operators can be placed on ground tiles and ranged operators on elevated tiles. Melee operators physically block enemies from advancing, and ranged operators deal ranged damage, heal or otherwise support melee operators. Players must place operators on the correct tiles to prevent the enemy from infiltrating the player's base. Once in place, an operator's skills can be activated after a time for special effects, or they can be withdrawn for redeployment after a delay.

Because there is often a limited number of viable solutions, especially at high difficulties, Arknights has also been described as a puzzle game. The gameplay does not require quick reaction times (the game is pauseable, and time slows down while commands are issued), but rather on-the-spot tactical analysis and foresight.

As the player progresses through the game, they unlock more stages, operators and resources, and are also introduced to new types of enemies and gameplay mechanics. Levels that have been cleared with a three-star rating can be auto-completed without player input, as the game records the player's actions and replicates them.

The game also has a base-building aspect, which allows players to construct facilities and assign operators to them. This allows players to increase their resources in the manner of an incremental game. It features the usual array of free-to-play, gacha game mechanics, such as daily login rewards and randomized character acquisition through virtual currency which can be obtained by playing the game, through limited-time events, or optional in-app purchases using real currency. Because of the limited resources available (even if real money is spent), another layer of challenge lies in "internalizing multiple complex economic systems" and in prioritizing the right operators to recruit and develop in order to build a capable roster. Arknights players have created a number of internet resources and tools to assist in this effort.

Seasonal gameplay events introduce more complex but optional difficulties and handicaps, such as the game's semi-quarterly Contingency Contract. Players are awarded with resources and medals exclusive to these events. A roguelike game mode, "Integrated Strategies", was added in 2022.

Plot 

The game is set in the dystopian, post-apocalyptic future setting of the planet Terra, where people exhibit kemonomimi features – characteristics of animals or mythological races. Natural disasters leave behind a valuable mineral, originium, which infects people with a progressive disease, oripathy, but also allows them to also use "Arts" (magic). Because oripathy is highly infectious and invariably fatal, the infected are shunned and persecuted. In response, some of them form the Reunion movement, a militant group waging war on the despotic governments of Terra.

The player takes the role of the masked and amnesiac "Doctor", who commands a team of "operators" of Rhodes Island, a pharmaceutical, medical, and self-defense organization. As oripathy spreads, Rhodes Island searches for a cure while defending itself against Reunion and several of the governments of Terra.

Music and voice acting 
Arknights has an eclectic soundtrack drawing on a range of Western and Asian musical genres. Hypergryph has partnered with musical groups across the world to release Arknights-related songs and music videos. These include Steve Aoki ("Last of Me"), Yellow Claw ("End Like This"), Starset ("Infected"), and Low Roar ("Feels", later re-released as "Fade Away"). Contributing composers include Go Shiina, Kevin Penkin and Adam Gubman.

The Arknights-related song "Renegade" written by Jason Walsh and performed by Substantial and X.ARI was nominated for "Best Original Song – Video Game" at the 2020 Hollywood Music in Media Awards.

The game's characters were voiced only in Japanese at the time of release. Chinese, Korean, and English voice acting is being incrementally added.

Reception 
Pocket Gamer highlighted the game's extensive lore and high production values. Julia Lee of Polygon wrote that "Arknights is the only gacha game I recommend to people" because of its art design, lack of purchase pressure and competition, and limited grind, and Sisi Jiang of Kotaku noted that Arknights is rare among gacha games in that its easily obtainable characters are better in some circumstances than the game's rare, high-powered operators.

The game was nominated for Google Play "Users' Choice Game" at the Best of 2020 awards and for "Best Science Fiction or Fantasy Mobile Game" at the 2020 Dragon Awards. It won an award as one of the Best Innovative Games of 2020.

Anime adaptation 
In December 2020, Hypergryph released a nine-minute Arknights anime video, "Holy Knight Light", on the occasion of the game's first global anniversary. It was made by the global publisher's in-house studio, Yostar Pictures, which previously made anime trailers for in-game events for the global version of the game.

In October 2021, Hypergryph published a teaser trailer for the first season ("Prelude to Dawn") of an anime adaptation of Arknights, also made by Yostar Pictures. The anime is a television series directed by Yuki Watanabe, with Masaki Nishikawa serving as assistant director, and Yuki Hayashi composing the music. Takashi Matsuyama is cast as Ace. The series aired from October 29 to December 17, 2022, on TV Tokyo in Japan. Crunchyroll licensed the series. The anime's opening theme song is "Alive" by Reona and the ending theme song is "BE ME" by Doul. A second season, "Perish in Frost", was announced at the end of the eighth episode.

A spin-off miniseries, Lee's Detective Agency, began airing on Crunchyroll on December 23, 2022.

Episode list

Notes

References

External links 
 Official English website
  Official Soundtrack website
 Official Endfield website
 Official Anime Website 

2019 video games
2022 anime ONAs
Android (operating system) games
Anime television series based on video games
Arson in fiction
Crunchyroll anime
Discrimination in fiction
Gacha games
IOS games
Post-apocalyptic video games
Roguelike video games
Tactical role-playing video games
Tower defense video games
Upcoming anime television series
Video games developed in China